Jirel is a Southern Tibetic language of Nepal. It is spoken in Jiri, in Tshetrapa village, Jungu village, and Cheppu village of Dolakha District and Sindhupalchok and different parts of Nepal.

It has long been in discussion that the Jirels are the Kirats as other Tibeto-Burmans. But further research is required to prove that they come from Kirats. Very weak literature without evidence is presented by some authors until now claiming that they are the Kirats. They have claimed that they are animists so they are Kirats. They adopted some cultural and religious practice from Sunuwars and Sherpas when they began to live and share with them. The language they use is the most powerful evidence that they come from a Tibetan ethnic tribe. Their physical appearance and family name are also supporting evidence for Tibetan origin.

They mainly practice Buddhism. Lamas are their priests. They also have Shamans who are called Phombo, which is derived from the word, Boo, the Tibetan Tantric philosophy.

Jirel Uchen, which is also called Sambhota Script, is their script or calligraphy. This can be found at religious monuments like chautaras, chortens, and monasteries. Jirel Lamas use this script. The script is shown below:

ཀ ka [ká] ཁ kha [kʰá] ག ga [ɡà/kʰːà] ང nga [ŋà]
ཅ ca [tɕá] ཆ cha [tɕʰá] ཇ ja [dʑà/tɕʰːà] ཉ nya [ɲà]
ཏ ta [tá] ཐ tha [tʰá] ད da [dà/tʰːà] ན na [nà]
པ pa [pá] ཕ pha [pʰá] བ ba [bà/pʰːà] མ ma [mà]
ཙ tsa [tsá] ཚ tsha [tsʰá] ཛ dza [dzà/tsʰːà] ཝ wa [wà]
ཞ zha [ʑà] ཟ za [zà] འ 'a [ʔà] ཡ ya [jà]
ར ra [rà] ལ la [là] ཤ sha [ɕá] ས sa [sá]
ཧ ha [há] ཨ a [ʔá

The similarity of Jirel language that with the language used in Buddhist holy books is the powerful evidence to claim and believe that they are of Tibetan origin. It is believed that more than 80 percent of Jirel diction goes with Tibetan language where only 35–40 percent of diction is found to be close to pure Tibetan diction.

References

Relevant literature
Strahm, Esther and Anita Maibaum. 1999. Verb pair in Jirel. Notes on Tibeto-Burman 4:1-24.

South Bodish languages
Languages of Nepal